was a Japanese industrial designer, best known for creating the design of the Kikkoman soy sauce bottle.

Biography
Born in Tokyo on September 11, 1929, Ekuan spent his youth in Hawaii. At the end of World War II, he moved to Hiroshima, where he witnessed the atomic bombing of the city, in which he lost his sister and his father, a Buddhist priest. He said the devastation motivated him to become a "creator of things".  Later he attended Tokyo National University of Fine Arts and Music (present-day Tokyo University of the Arts). In 1957, he founded . "GK" stood for "Group of Koike", as Koike was the name of an associate professor at the university.

In 1970, he became president of the Japan Industrial Designers' Association and five years later he was elected as president of the International Council of Societies of Industrial Design.

During his lifetime he served as chair of the Japan Institute of Design, dean of Shizuoka University of Art and Culture was and a trustee of the Art Center College of Design.

Ekuan died in the hospital in Tokyo on February 8, 2015, at the age of 85.

Selected works
Products that Ekuan oversaw the design of included the following.
 Kikkoman soy sauce bottle, 1961
 Yamaha VMAX motorcycle, 2008

Railway vehicles
 253 series Narita Express train, 1991
 E3 Series Shinkansen Komachi train, 1997
 E259 series Narita Express train, 2009
 E233 series commuter train, 2006

Logos
 Tokyo Metropolitan Government logo, 1989
 Ministop convenience store logo
 Japan Racing Association logo

He also served as co-general producer for the World Design Exposition 1989 held in Nagoya.

Honors and awards
 1979: Colin King Grand Prix - International Council of Societies of Industrial Design
 1995: Sir Misha Black Medal
 1997: Ordre des Arts et des Lettres - French Minister of Culture
 2000: Order of the Rising Sun, Gold Rays with Rosette
 2003: Lucky Strike Designer Award - Raymond Loewy Foundation
 2004: Commander in the Order of the Lion of Finland
 2014: Compasso d'Oro for Lifetime Achievement - Associazione per il Disegno Industriale

Published books

References

External links
 GK Design website

1929 births
2015 deaths
Japanese industrial designers
Officiers of the Ordre des Arts et des Lettres
Recipients of the Order of the Rising Sun
Commanders of the Order of the Lion of Finland
Tokyo University of the Arts alumni
Artists from Tokyo
Japanese motorcycle designers